Ron Meyer (August 27, 1944 – May 7, 2018) is a former American football quarterback who played for one season in the National Football League (NFL). He played college football at South Dakota State.

Early life and high school
Meyer was born in Austin, Minnesota and grew up in Wells, Minnesota. He attended Wells High School where he was a four sport athlete, playing football, basketball and baseball and also was a pole vaulter on the track and field team.

College career
Meyer was a three-year starter at quarterback for the South Dakota State Jackrabbits. As a sophomore he threw a then-school record 19 touchdown passes and was named All-North Central Conference (NCC). He was named All-NCC again after setting a new record for passing yards in a season with 1,385 in his junior season. Meyer finished his collegiate career with 3,608 passing yards and 41 career touchdown passes. Meyer also played baseball for two seasons as a first baseman and pitcher on South Dakota State's baseball team and played one season of basketball for the Jackrabbits.

Professional career
Meyer was selected in the seventh round of the 1966 NFL Draft by the Chicago Bears, but was cut during training camp. He was later signed by the Pittsburgh Steelers and spent most of the season on the team's taxi squad and briefly was a member of the Wheeling Ironmen of the Continental Football League. Meyer played in four games for the Steelers, completing seven of 19 pass attempts for 59 yards with one interception.

Post-football life
After the end of his playing career Meyer returned to South Dakota State to complete his degree in education, graduating in 1968. He was a teacher and coach at Windom High School in Windom, Minnesota for 33 years before retiring in 2001. Meyer died on May 7, 2018.

References

1944 births
Players of American football from Minnesota
American football quarterbacks
South Dakota State Jackrabbits football players
Pittsburgh Steelers players
Chicago Bears players
2018 deaths
South Dakota State Jackrabbits baseball players
South Dakota State Jackrabbits men's basketball players
People from Wells, Minnesota
Continental Football League players